Pulaski Academy (PA) is a private, independent college preparatory preschool, elementary, and junior/senior high school headed by Brock Dunn in the Pleasant Valley neighborhood of Little Rock, Arkansas, United States. PA was established in 1971 as a segregation academy and remains as the only independent, non-sectarian, college preparatory school in Arkansas.

History 
When busing was introduced in the early 1970s to counteract the effects of racially defined residential patterns, whites built private schools in the suburbs or fled the county altogether. In 1971, the segregationist businessman William F. Rector announced the construction of the private Pulaski Academy in the western suburbs of the city for those, he said, who "don't like busing." Pulaski was the first school established after the Swann v. Charlotte-Mecklenburg Board of Education decision (1971). Rector said, "I even hope we'll be allowed to play Dixie if we want to without having a riot about it."

In 2003, one of 102 graduating seniors was black.

In the 2015–2016 school year, 955 of 1,221 students in grades 1-12 were white (78%).  In 2016, Little Rock was 48% white.

Academics
PA is accredited by ISACS (Independent Schools Association of the Central States), and ANSAA (Arkansas Non-public School Accrediting Association). PA is a member of the Cum Laude Society, Council for the Advancement and Support of Education (CASE), Arkansas Activities Association (AAA), College Board and NAIS (National Association of Independent Schools).

Pulaski Academy was named 2003 "Best of the Best" Private High School by the readers of an Arkansas Democrat-Gazette contest.

During the 2008–09 academic year, fifteen members of the Class of 2009 were named as National Merit Scholars, three as Commended Scholars and twelve as Finalists. Enrollment for 2009-10 is approximately 1,210 K-12 students, with a student/teacher ratio of 8.9:1.

Extracurricular activities 

The school's mascot is the Bruin and school colors are Navy blue and Vegas gold. For 2012–14, the Pulaski Academy Bruins play in the 5A Central Conference administered by the Arkansas Activities Association. The school participates in baseball, basketball (boys/girls), cheer, cross country, Pom, football, soccer (boys/girls), softball, swimming and diving (boys/girls), tennis (boys/girls), golf (boys/girls) volleyball(girls), lacrosse (boys/girls), and wrestling.

The school's football team has won nine state championships since 2003. The team was coached by Kevin Kelley until 2021, who gained notoriety for his strategies, which include the total rejection of punting and returning punts, as well as a reliance on the onside kick.The team is now coached by Anthony Lucas.

Athletic state championships 
The Pulaski Academy Bruins have won 68 state championships:

 Wrestling (3x): 2018, 2019, 2020
 Girls Tennis (17x): 1980, 1987, 1988, 1989, 1992, 1994, 2003, 2004, 2005, 2006, 2010, 2015, 2017, 2019, 2020, 2021, 2022
 Boys Tennis (17x): 1987, 2002, Fall 2003, Spring 2003, 2004, 2005, 2007, 2010, 2011, 2012, 2015, 2016, 2017, 2018, 2019, 2020, 2021
 Baseball (5x): 1993, 1994, 2002, 2003, 2013 5A
 Girls Soccer (7x): 2003, 2005, 2007, 2008, 2011, 2012, 2021, 2022
 Boys Soccer (3x): 2000, 2001, 2007
 Football (10x): (2003 3A), (2008 5A), (2011 4A) (2014 5A), (2015 5A), (2016 5A), (2017 5A), (2019 5A), (2020 5A), (2021 5A), (2022 6A)
 Boys Basketball (2x): 2002, 2003
 All Golf Team (5x) : 2000, 2001, 2003, 2004, 2006
Dance (1x) : 2020

Notable alumni
 Amy Lee, the lead singer of Evanescence.  The song Listen to the Rain, written by her, was sung at her Class of 2000 graduation ceremony
 Jonathan Luigs, played in the NFL for the Cincinnati Bengals
 Hunter Henry, tight end in the NFL for the New England Patriots
 Jason King, former offensive guard in the NFL for the New England Patriots and Baltimore Ravens
 Will Hastings, American football wide receiver
 Ayana Gray, American novelist
 David Venable, American intelligence officer, author, and business man

References

External links

 

African-American history in Little Rock, Arkansas
High schools in Little Rock, Arkansas
Preparatory schools in Arkansas
Educational institutions established in 1971
Private high schools in Arkansas
Private middle schools in Arkansas
Private elementary schools in Arkansas
Segregation academies in Arkansas
1971 establishments in Arkansas